Belaire Apartments (also known as the Belaire Condominiums and The Belaire) is a mixed-use high-rise condominium apartment building in Manhattan, New York City. The 42-story building is located at 524 East 72nd Street between York Avenue and the FDR Drive.

Description
It has 183 condominium apartments, a health club, parking garage and swimming pool. The first fourteen floors are used by the Hospital for Special Surgery. The building has prominent views overlooking the East River.

It was designed by Frank Williams and Associates, and features a red brick facade. The building has a reinforced concrete structure, making it one of the tallest concrete buildings at the time of its construction.

History
The building was completed in 1988 and was constructed by the Zeckendorf Company, on the site previously occupied by a parking garage owned by the Hospital for Special Surgery.

After construction Belaire enjoyed property tax reduction for 10 years as result of Section 421-a tax exemption certificates, a New York City affordable housing program. This became possible as another company rehabilitated 30 apartments at Spring Creek Gardens complex in East New York and sold the resulting tax benefits to the Zeckendorf Company.

, residents included novelist Carol Higgins Clark (38th floor); developer Arthur W. Zeckendorf (42nd floor); former Bloomingdale's CEO and Chairman Marvin S. Traub; once-jailed junk-bond king Ivan Boesky; Cigar Aficionado and Wine Spectator magazines publisher Marvin R. Shanken and Cleveland Guardians manager Manny Acta, and Ex-President of Pakistan Asif Ali Zardari.

, the Hospital for Special Surgery continued to own the land, and in exchange for selling the development rights to Zeckendorf, it received use of the lower 12 floors for offices. Originally, nurses and technicians were housed there, as these individuals had a difficult time finding affordable housing in New York. Floors 13-22 were still used for housing hospital staff and guests. The Belaire also houses office and laboratory space, sports injury rehabilitation areas, and guest facilities for family members of patients at the Hospital to which it is connected via a causeway on the third floor.

Plane crash 

On October 11, 2006, a four-seat, Cirrus Design SR-20 single-engine, fixed-wing aircraft owned by New York Yankees pitcher Cory Lidle crashed into the apartment building, killing both occupants, Lidle and his flight instructor Tyler Stanger, and severely injuring one resident in the post impact fire. Initial fears that the incident was terrorist-related were unfounded, as confirmed by the FBI.

References

External links
Belaire Apartments profile at NYC Department of Buildings website
 Belaire Apartments at Skyscraperpage.com

Residential skyscrapers in Manhattan
Residential condominiums in New York City
Residential buildings completed in 1988
Upper East Side
1988 establishments in New York City